Lieutenant General Hanford MacNider (October 2, 1889 – February 18, 1968) was a senior officer of the United States Army who fought in both world wars. He also served as a diplomat, the Assistant Secretary of War of the United States from 1925 to 1928 and the National Commander of The American Legion from 1921 to 1922. He was also the United States Ambassador to Canada.

Early life 
Hanford MacNider was born in Mason City, Iowa as the son of Charles H. MacNider, a prominent banker, and May Hanford. He attended Milton Academy (a boarding school in Massachusetts) and subsequently Harvard University, where he graduated in 1911 before returning to Iowa.

MacNider joined the National Guard and served during the Pancho Villa Expedition during the Mexican Revolution. During World War I, he served as a captain in the 2nd Division within American Expeditionary Forces in France. The story goes that military charges were laid against him when one of his men disagreed with a colonel. He then supposedly went AWOL to get to the front. When authorities finally caught up to him, he had already risen through the ranks to Lieutenant Colonel and won 14 medals, so charges were dropped. For extraordinary heroism in the battle, MacNider was decorated with two Distinguished Service Cross, three Silver Stars, Italian War Merit Cross, French Légion d'honneur, and French Croix de Guerre with Palm.

The American Legion 
MacNider was Commander of the American Legion Department of Iowa, from 1920 to 1921, before being elevated to the office of National Commander, serving from 1921 to 1922.

Political career 

President Calvin Coolidge appointed MacNider Assistant Secretary of War in 1925 where Major Dwight Eisenhower was his executive assistant. He married Margaret McAuley in 1925. He was considered a possible Republican candidate in the 1928 United States presidential election, but after the death of his father, MacNider returned to Iowa to handle the family's business affairs which thrived despite the Depression.

President Herbert Hoover appointed him as Envoy Extraordinary and Minister Plenipotentiary (Canada) in 1930. In 1932, he resigned in an unsuccessful attempt to be made the Republican candidate for vice president. In 1940, he again failed to receive the Republican nomination for president and declined the vice presidential candidacy under Wendell Lewis Willkie. He also turned down a cabinet position offered by President Dwight Eisenhower.

World War II 

During World War II, he was wounded while commanding the Buna Task Force in New Guinea. After recovery, he was given the command of the 158th Regimental Combat Team (the Bushmasters) at the Bicol Peninsula. His command of the 158th RCT in the Philippines was excellent and it was there that some of the toughest fighting of the war occurred.

A regimental legend contends that at one point men of the 3rd battalion became drunk from a cache of Japanese Sake, at which point MacNider finding the men in poor conditions downed a whole bottle in a single moment and decried the troops for being poor soldiers. MacNider earned the respect and love of the men of the 158th by his courage and great battlefield leadership, this has led to an almost mythical reputation in the regiment even today.

MacNider was eventually promoted to brigadier general in the United States Army, and then major general until his retirement in 1951.  After retirement, he was promoted to lieutenant general by an act of Congress on August 7, 1956.  He is one of only four individuals to be promoted to lieutenant general after retirement from the army.

Death 
On February 18, 1968, while on vacation in Sarasota, Florida, he died at a hospital of pulmonary edema.  It has been said that he was interred in Mason City's Elmwood Saint Joseph Cemetery; the cemetery office has no record of his burial, and it is believed that he was cremated and his ashes scattered in an unknown location.

Legacy 
Today MacNider is considered one of Iowa's greatest war heroes, the 158th RCT (Infantry) wartime leader, and an effective politician during the inter-war years.  He is one of a very few individuals to be awarded three Distinguished Service Crosses.

Military awards 
Hanford MacNider received during his military career many decorations and awards for heroism and distinguished service. Here are official citations of the most important military decorations:

First Distinguished Service Cross citation 
The official U.S. Army citation for his first Distinguished Service Cross reads:

General Orders: War Department, General Orders No. 44 (1919)
Action Date: October 3–9, 1918
Name: Hanford MacNider
Service: Army
Rank: Captain
Regiment: 9th Infantry Regiment
Division: 2d Division, American Expeditionary Forces
Citation: The President of the United States of America, authorized by Act of Congress, July 9, 1918, takes pleasure in presenting the Distinguished Service Cross to Captain (Infantry) Hanford MacNider, United States Army, for extraordinary heroism in action while serving with 9th Infantry Regiment, 2d Division, A.E.F., near Medeah Ferme, France, October 3–9, 1918. Captain MacNider voluntarily joined an attacking battalion on 3 October and accompanied it to its final objectives. During the second attack on the same day, he acted as a runner through heavy artillery and machine-gun fire. He visited the lines both night and day, where the fighting was most severe. When higher authority could not be reached, he assumed responsibilities, and gave the necessary orders to stabilize serious situations. When new and untried troops took up the attack, he joined their forward elements, determined the enemy points of resistance by personal reconnaissance, uncovered enemy machine-gun nests and supervised their destruction.

Second Distinguished Service Cross citation 
The official U.S. Army citation for his second Distinguished Service Cross reads:

General Orders: War Department, General Orders No. 44 (1919)
Action Date: September 12, 1918
Name: Hanford MacNider
Service: Army
Rank: Captain
Regiment: 9th Infantry Regiment
Division: 2d Division, American Expeditionary Forces
Citation: The President of the United States of America, authorized by Act of Congress, July 9, 1918, takes pleasure in presenting a Bronze Oak Leaf Cluster in lieu of a Second Award of the Distinguished Service Cross to Captain (Infantry) Hanford MacNider, United States Army, for extraordinary heroism in action while serving with 9th Infantry Regiment, 2d Division, A.E.F., near Remeriauville, France, 12 September 1918. On duty as regimental adjutant, while carrying instructions to the assaulting lines, Captain MacNider found the line unable to advance and being disorganized by a heavy machine-gun fire. Running forward in the face of the fire, this officer captured a German machine-gun, drove off the crew, reorganized the line on that flank, and thereby enabled the advance to continue.

Third Distinguished Service Cross citation 
The official U.S. Army citation for his third Distinguished Service Cross reads:

General Orders: Headquarters, South West Pacific Area, General Orders No. 12 (1943)
Name: Hanford MacNider
Service: Army
Rank: Brigadier General
Regiment: Commanding officer
Division: Buna Task Force
Citation: Brigadier General Hanford MacNider, United States Army, was awarded a Second Bronze Oak Leaf Cluster in lieu of a Third Award of the Distinguished Service Cross for extraordinary heroism in connection with military operations against an armed enemy, in action against enemy forces during World War II. Brigadier General MacNider's intrepid actions, personal bravery and zealous devotion to duty exemplify the highest traditions of the military forces of the United States and reflect great credit upon himself, his unit, and the United States Army.

Distinguished Service Medal citation 
The official U.S. Army citation for his Distinguished Service Medal reads:

General Orders: War Department, General Orders No. 89 (August 13, 1946)
Action Date: October 1943 - October 1945
Name: Hanford MacNider
Service: Army
Rank: Brigadier General
Regiment: Commanding officer
Division: Buna Task Force
Citation: The President of the United States of America, authorized by Act of Congress July 9, 1918, takes pleasure in presenting the Army Distinguished Service Medal to Brigadier General Hanford MacNider (ASN: 0-108101), United States Army, for exceptionally meritorious and distinguished services to the Government of the United States, in a duty of great responsibility during the period from October 1943 to October 1945. The singularly distinctive accomplishments of General MacNider reflect the highest credit upon himself and the United States Army.

Ribbon bar 
Here is the ribbon bar of Lieutenant General (Ret.) Hanford MacNider:

See also 
List of people from Iowa

References

External links 

Hanford MacNider at Coalition to Oppose the Arms Trade

Generals of World War II

1889 births
1968 deaths
20th-century American politicians
Ambassadors of the United States to Canada
American anti-war activists
United States Army personnel of World War I
United States Army personnel of World War II
Commandeurs of the Légion d'honneur
Coolidge administration personnel
Harvard University alumni
Hoover administration personnel
Iowa Republicans
Milton Academy alumni
National Commanders of the American Legion
National Guard (United States) generals
People from Mason City, Iowa
Presidency of Calvin Coolidge
Recipients of the Air Medal
Recipients of the Croix de Guerre 1914–1918 (France)
Recipients of the Distinguished Service Cross (United States)
Recipients of the Distinguished Service Medal (US Army)
Recipients of the Legion of Merit
Recipients of the Philippine Legion of Honor
Recipients of the Silver Star
Recipients of the War Merit Cross (Italy)
United States Army generals
United States Assistant Secretaries of War
United States Army generals of World War II